Dolichoderus inpai is a species of ant in the genus Dolichoderus. Described by Harada in 1987, the species is endemic to Brazil and Ecuador.

References

Dolichoderus
Hymenoptera of South America
Insects described in 1987